Giovanni De Martin (7 December 1927 – 4 November 1999) was an Italian bobsledder who competed in the late 1950s. He finished fifth in the four-man event at the 1956 Winter Olympics in Cortina d'Ampezzo.

References

External links
 
1956 bobsleigh four-man results
Wallechinsky, David (1984). "Bobsled: Four-man". In The Complete Book of the Olympics: 1896 - 1980. New York: Penguin Books. p. 561.

1927 births
1999 deaths
Italian male bobsledders
Olympic bobsledders of Italy
Bobsledders at the 1956 Winter Olympics